Nymble may refer to:

Nymble (Pokémon), a Pokémon species
Nymble, a building of the Student Union at the Royal Institute of Technology in Stockholm, Sweden

See also
 Nimble (disambiguation)